Sally Wood may refer to:

Sally Wood (writer) (1759–1855), American novelist
Sally L. Wood, American engineer
Sally Elizabeth Wood (1857–1928), Canadian photographer
Sally Wood, theatrical producer and wife of Ronnie Wood

See also
Sara Wood (disambiguation)